Eleanor Tiernan (born 1976) is an Irish stand-up comedian, writer, and actress.

Background
Tiernan is from the Roscommon side of Athlone. She studied engineering in University College Galway. She moved to London in 2015.

Career
Tiernan came to attention as a stand-up in the UK and Ireland. , she has performed at the Edinburgh Fringe 9 times. She was a panellist on The Panel. She performed on Stuart Lee's Alternative Comedy Experience. She wrote and performed sketches for three seasons of Irish Pictorial Weekly. Her 2007 show was called "Help". Her 2014 show was called "Help The Frigid". Her 2015 stand-up tour was entitled "National Therapy Project". In 2022 she starred in ITV / Virgin Media Ireland's Holding.

As a writer, she has written for the Irish edition of the Sunday Times, and been a regular columnist in The Irish Examiner she has contributed to Buffering.

In 2020, Tiernan released a stand-up special Success Without a Sex Tape for BBC Radio 4, based on her 2018 Edinburgh show.

Tiernan took part in Radio 4's The News Quiz in April 2022.

Personal life
Inspired in part by Phillip Schofield, Tiernan came out publicly as gay in her 40's. She has undergone cognitive behavioral therapy.

She is a cousin of another Irish stand-up Tommy Tiernan.

Television Credits
 Liffey Laughs (RTÉ)
 The Panel (RTÉ)
 Irish Pictorial Weekly (RTÉ)
 Headwreckers (Channel 4)
 Holding (ITV/Virgin Media Ireland)

References

External links

Irish television actresses
Irish lesbian writers
Irish lesbian actresses
Irish women comedians
Living people
1976 births
Lesbian comedians
Lesbian screenwriters
21st-century Irish screenwriters
Irish women screenwriters
Alumni of the University of Galway
Actors from County Roscommon
People from Athlone
Irish LGBT comedians
Irish LGBT screenwriters